Platycorynus peregrinus is a species of beetles belonging to the Chrysomelidae family.

Description
The body is usually metallic blue, sometimes blue-black or blue-violet.

This leaf eating beetle is primarily herbivorous and secondarily graminivorous. The preferred host plants are the very toxic Calotropis procera, various Digitaria species and some plants of economic importance (e.g. Solanum melongena, Hibiscus esculentus, Abelmoschus esculentus, Lycopersicon esculentum and Solanum tuberosum).

Distribution
This species can be found in Pakistan, India, Sri Lanka, Myanmar, Nepal, Thailand, Cambodia, Laos, Vietnam, SW China and Malaysia.

References

 
 Purushottam Prasad, Singh, B. K.  Studies on the food and food preference in Platycorynus peregrinus

Taxa named by Johann Friedrich Wilhelm Herbst
Beetles described in 1783
Eumolpinae
Beetles of Asia
Beetles of Sri Lanka
Insects of Pakistan
Insects of India
Insects of Myanmar
Insects of Nepal
Insects of Thailand
Insects of Cambodia
Insects of Laos
Insects of Vietnam
Insects of China
Insects of Malaysia